Reynoldstown is a historic district and intown neighborhood on the near east side of Atlanta, Georgia, located two miles from downtown. The neighborhood is gentrifying and attracting new families, empty-nesters, Atlantans opposed to long commutes; as well as diverse culture of first-time homebuyers, single professionals, artist and students due to its close proximity to other nearby intown neighborhoods, high walkability index, urban amenities and nearby bohemian hotspots on Carroll Street in the adjoined-at-the-hip also historic Cabbagetown neighborhood and in other surrounding communities.

History and demographics

Reynoldstown is a community that was originally settled after the American Civil War by freed slaves who were employed by the railroad. Madison and Sarah Reynolds were among the first ex-slaves to move into the area, and it is believed that the neighborhood was named after them. Reynoldstown was annexed by the city of Atlanta in 1909 and celebrates its historic tie to freed slave roots and artistic expressions to empower residents with its annual Wheelbarrow Festival. The neighborhood continued to thrive and prosper until the 1950s when the railroad industry began to decline. Reynoldstown began gentrifying in the 1990s, altering the demographic makeup of the neighborhood where today it is closer to a mix of 65% white and 35% African-American population composition. The neighborhood was listed as a Historic District on the National Register of Historic Places in 2003.

Geography
Reynoldstown is bordered on the west by Pearl Street, across which is Cabbagetown and, south of Memorial Drive, Grant Park; on the east by Moreland Avenue and Edgewood; on the south by I-20, across which is the Ormewood Park neighborhood and an industrial area which is officially part of Grant Park; and on the north by the railroad line and Inman Park.

Reynoldstown lies in NPU N. It is listed on the National Register of Historic Places as a historic district. Local landmarks include the Colgate Mattress Factory, Trees Atlanta headquarters and nursery, and the former Atlanta & West Point Railroad depot, which now houses a restaurant.

Parks and trails
The BeltLine bisects Reynoldstown north-south. It functions as a paved walking and biking trail, and possibly for transit use (either light rail or streetcar).  Just north of Reynoldstown in Inman Park adjacent the intersection of Krog St and Irwin St, The East Side Trail, part of The Beltline, is paved from here to Piedmont Park through Inman Park, Old Fourth Ward, Poncey-Highland and Virginia-Highland.  The CSX railroad Hulsey Yard forms the northern border of the neighborhood, a current issue is how to connect the southeast BeltLine to the Eastside Trail portion of the BeltLine across the yard. The southern wall of the yard on Wylie Street in Reynoldstown and Cabbagetown is a prominent location for street art in Atlanta. Lang-Carson Park also lies within Reynoldstown.

Crime
The CRiSP - Cabbagetown/Reynoldstown Security Patrol was founded by a small group of concerned Cabbagetown residents who wanted to be proactive about fighting crime in their community and was later joined by residents of Reynoldstown. CRiSP provides additional police and private security presence in Reynoldstown and Cabbagetown, helping to make the communities safer and to improve the quality of life for residents and visitors.

Transportation
Memorial Drive is the major thoroughfare passing through the south end of Reynoldstown, with mostly light industrial properties, many of which are now repurposed for residential, retail and entertainment use. Reynoldstown contains rail right-of-way that is planned for the Beltline. Reynoldstown is served by the Inman Park/Reynoldstown MARTA station.

References

External links
 
 Reynoldstown Yahoo Group (900+ member daily communication tool)
 Facebook - Reynoldstown Neighbors, closed group with 1500+ members
 Reynoldstown Nextdoor (private community social network)
 Reynoldstown News on Google News (Reynoldstown mentions on Google News)
 Reynoldstown Civic Improvement League (RCIL, neighborhood association website)
 CRiSP - Cabbagetown/Reynoldstown Security Patrol 
 Trees Atlanta hq'd in Reynoldstown
 Atlanta Habitat for Humanity
 Wonderroot  
 Lofts at Reynoldstown Crossing Case Study - Atlanta BeltLine
 Milltown Lofts (located in Reynoldstown) related links
 Resources for Residents and Communities (RRC) - hq'd in Reynoldstown

Neighborhoods in Atlanta
Historic districts in Atlanta
Colonial Revival architecture in Georgia (U.S. state)
Historic districts on the National Register of Historic Places in Georgia (U.S. state)
National Register of Historic Places in Atlanta